Franz Joseph Hugi (1791–1855) was a Swiss geologist and teacher who was called the "father of winter mountaineering," and was author of two pioneer works on glacier phenomena.

References

1791 births
1855 deaths
19th-century Swiss geologists